Minsheng Road (also called 8th Blvd.) is an east–west 4-lane to 10-lane arterial in Taipei, Taiwan connecting the Songshan District and Datong District of Taipei City. Minsheng Road is divided into east and west sections, with five smaller sections in the east section and only one is the west section.

Landmarks 

Notable landmarks along Minsheng Road include:
 Former residence of Chao Cheng-ming
 Evergreen Marine Corp.
 Mackay Memorial Hospital
 National Taipei University

Major Intersections

Minsheng West Road 
 Huanhe North Road expressway (1st Ave)
 Chongging North Road (3rd Ave)
 Chengde Road (5th Ave)
 Zhongshan North Road (6th Ave)

Minsheng East Road 
 Xinsheng Road/Expressway (8th Ave)
 Songjiang Road (9th Ave)
 Jianguo Road/Expressway (10th Ave)
 Fuxing North Road (11th Ave)
 Dunhua North Road (12th Ave)
 Guangfu North Road (13th Ave)
 Sanmin Road (large signalized roundabout)
 Tayou Road

See also

 List of roads in Taiwan

Streets in Taipei